Imsterberg is a municipality and a town in the district of Imst located  west of Imst.

Population

Economy
The main source of income is agriculture.

References

Cities and towns in Imst District